Charger or Chargers may refer to:

 Charger (table setting), decorative plates used to fancify a place setting
 Battery charger, a device used to put energy into a cell or battery
 Capacitor charger, typically a high voltage DC power supply designed to rapidly charge a bank of capacitors in pulsed power applications
 Whipped-cream charger, a cartridge designed to deliver nitrous oxide in a whipped cream dispenser
 Charger (firearm), a common and chiefly British term for a stripper clip, used in the reloading of firearms
 A medieval war horse
 A type of special infected in Left 4 Dead 2
 The squadron name for US Navy Strike Fighter Squadron VFA-161

Music
 "Charger" (song), a song by Gorillaz from the album Humanz
 The Chargers (band), an American garage rock band

Sports
 Gold Coast Chargers, an Australian rugby league team
 Los Angeles Chargers, a professional American football team
 Deccan Chargers, an Indian cricket team
 Alabama–Huntsville Chargers
 London Chargers, a rugby league club
 Jackson Chargers, a soccer club
 Ansonia Chargers, football team at Ansonia High School (Connecticut)

Vehicles
 NATO code name for the Tupolev Tu-144 supersonic transport
 Dodge Charger, three entirely different Dodge vehicles bearing the Charger nameplate
 Siemens Charger, a model of diesel-electric rail locomotive
 Chrysler Valiant Charger, produced by Chrysler Australia from 1971
 Convair Charger prototype light attack and observation aircraft

See also 

 Charge (disambiguation)
 Chargeurs
 Supercharger (disambiguation)
 Tesla Megacharger
 Turbocharger